Castlevania, known in Japan as  is a platform game developed and published by Konami for the Family Computer Disk System video game console in Japan in September 1986. It was ported to cartridge format and released in North America for the Nintendo Entertainment System (NES) in May 1987 and in Europe in 1988. It was also re-issued for the Family Computer in cartridge format in 1993. It is the first game in Konami's Castlevania video game series.

Players control Simon Belmont, descendant of a legendary vampire hunter, who enters the castle of Count Dracula to destroy him when he suddenly reappears 100 years after Simon's ancestor vanquished him. Castlevania was developed in tandem with the MSX2 game Vampire Killer, which was released a month later and uses the same characters and setting, but features different gameplay mechanics. It was followed by a sequel, Castlevania II: Simon's Quest, and a prequel, Castlevania III: Dracula's Curse, both of which were also released for the NES. Super Castlevania IV was released in 1991 for the Super NES and follows the same story. A remake for the Sharp X68000 home computer was released in 1993, and was later re-released for the PlayStation as Castlevania Chronicles in 2001.

Castlevania was positively received and financially successful. It is considered an NES classic by PC World, while Nintendo Power and Game Informer ranked it in their list of best video games ever made.

Gameplay

Castlevania uses platform gameplay and is divided into six blocks of three stages each, for a total of 18 stages. Simon can move, jump, crouch, climb stairs and use a magic whip (known in the series as the "Vampire Killer") as his primary combat weapon. When the player presses the button to crack the whip, there is a short delay before Simon actually does so. The player begins the game with four lives and five hearts, and must complete the current block of stages before a timer runs out. Simon has a health meter, which decreases whenever he is hit by an enemy or projectile. One life is lost if either the meter or the timer reaches zero, or if Simon falls off the bottom of the screen or is hit by a moving spiked ceiling. Hidden food items restore health, and bonus lives are earned at certain score thresholds. The player fights a boss character, usually themed after a classic horror movie monster such as Frankenstein's monster or the Grim Reaper, at the end of each block, and must win the battle and pick up a red orb that restores all health before time runs out in order to advance. The ultimate goal is to defeat Count Dracula himself and the Curse of Man at the end of Stage 18, triggering the collapse of Dracula's castle and allowing the player to restart the game at an increased difficulty.

Throughout the game, the player can find and use various backup weapons, including throwing knives, axes, vials of holy water, a magical watch that can briefly freeze enemies, and sacred crosses that function as boomerangs. However, only one such weapon can be carried at a time; if the player picks up a new one or loses a life, the weapon is automatically lost. Backup weapons require hearts for their use, which can be found by extinguishing candles or defeating enemies with the whip. Other hidden items include point bonuses (sacks of money), temporary invincibility (golden jar), upgrades to the whip's length and power (metal chain), instant destruction of all on-screen enemies (blue rosary) and double to triple use of the backup weapon.

When all lives are lost, the player has the option to continue from the start of the block or return to the title screen.

Development

Castlevania was directed by Hitoshi Akamatsu. An admirer of cinema, Akamatsu approached projects with a "film director's eye", and said the visuals and music for Castlevania were "made by people who consciously wanted to do something cinematic." With Castlevania, he wanted players to feel like they were in a classic horror film.

It was originally released for the Family Computer Disk System in 1986. Due to its success in Japan, it was released in cartridge format for the Nintendo Entertainment System (NES) under the title of Castlevania in 1987 in North America and 1988 in Europe, and re-released in cartridge format for the Japanese Famicom under its original title in 1993. The international name of Castlevania was the result of Konami of America senior vice president Emil Heidkamp's discomfort with the religious connotations of the title Akumajō Dracula, which he believed translated as "Dracula Satanic Castle". Castlevania was one of the first major platform games on the NES and a part of an unofficial second wave of video games for the NES. Its release coincided with the 90th anniversary of Bram Stoker's Dracula.

The player-character Simon was originally named Peter Dante, a vampire killer who was a grandson of Christopher Dante. At the time, whip attacks were planned to be in multiple directions, an idea later seen in Super Castlevania IV. Other sub-weapons were planned, such as garlic, wooden stakes and an item that transforms the player-character into a werewolf, but they were not included in the game.

A game also titled Akumajō Dracula was developed for the MSX2 simultaneously. It was released a month after the Disk System game. It was released in Europe under the title Vampire Killer where it was the first game in the series to be released. The MSX2 version featured different areas and new gameplay.

Versions and re-releases
Castlevania has been ported to a variety of different video game consoles, handheld game consoles, home computer systems and mobile phones.

A ROM cartridge version of the game was released for the Japanese Family Computer in 1993. The release omitted the name registration screen from the original Famicom Disk version (as well as saving) and included an "Easy" mode.

In 2002, Konami released the first three NES Castlevania games for Windows as Konami Collector's Series: Castlevania & Contra.

In 2004, Castlevania was released for the Game Boy Advance as part of the Classic NES Series published by Nintendo. The original end credits of the game, which consisted of puns on the names of horror movie stars, were removed in this version.

The original game was included as one of 30 games featured on the 2016 NES Classic Edition.

The game is included in Castlevania Anniversary Collection, a compilation released as part of Konami's 50th anniversary. In Japan, this compilation includes the 1993 Famicom port instead of the original version. This contrasts the Virtual Console which used the Famicom Disk System version in all of its Japanese rereleases.

Reception

Since its original release, Castlevania has received a generally positive reception. Japanese gaming publication Famitsu gave it a score of 34 out of 40. Computer and Video Games also gave it a positive review in 1989, praising the "huge playing area and lots of neat touches" that would "keep you engrossed for weeks." They criticized the "gaudy graphics" but said "it's the gameplay that counts, and it's great!" It sold impressively and was considered a classic by Retro Gamer and IGN.

It was rated the 22nd best game made on a Nintendo System in Nintendo Powers Top 200 Games list in 2006. In August 2008, Nintendo Power listed it as the 14th-best Nintendo Entertainment System video game. In 2001, Game Informer ranked it the 48th-best game ever made; the staff noted that its gameplay set a standard for the industry. IGN ranked it 19th on their list of the best NES games; the second and third Castlevania games were ranked 25th and fifth, respectively. It was praised for its difficulty, gameplay, soundtrack and visuals. GameZone ranked it as the eighth-best Castlevania game. Robert Workman (an editor for GameZone) felt that the game had aged well and was a great value on the Wii Virtual Console. IGNs Lucas M. Thomas noted the relative realism of Castlevanias weapons versus "glowing flowers that let you throw bouncing fireballs." He also praised it for feeling scary while also not taking itself too seriously. The combination of these elements and others caused him to credit it as a "unique and wonderful" game and a game that made an impact on later Castlevania titles. Retro Gamer called it one of the most enduring video games ever made. It attributed its quality less so to its unique gameplay and more so to the adult atmosphere and challenge for players. In his review of the Virtual Console version, IGNs Mark Birnbaum personally enjoyed its difficulty and design but noted that people who were quick to become frustrated would enjoy the Super NES sequel Super Castlevania IV better. 1UP.com's Kurt Kalata praised its level of difficulty and its realistic visual design.

Game Informers Tim Turi claimed that the original Castlevania made the series a "legend" and called it the "essential Castlevania experience." IGN wrote a piece that discussed the idea that this game as well as other early Castlevania titles were overshadowed by the 1997 Castlevania: Symphony of the Night, which it considered the best title in the series. It cited this game's absence from IGN's top 100 games of all time as well as the absence of the second and third Castlevanias from Game Informers 'top 100 games of all time' list. It suggested that the reason this is the case is because of the NES games' high learning curve and difficulty level. It also felt that Symphony of the Nights influence on the series after its release caused people to forget about the NES games. It praised the Virtual Console for allowing players unfamiliar with these games to experience them more easily. IGN's Lucas M. Thomas included its 25th anniversary in a list of forgotten anniversaries which took place in 2011. He felt it odd that Castlevania had so many titles before its 25th anniversary, yet only released one title during 2011.

The Classic NES Series re-release of the game was met with mixed to positive reception. It holds an average score of 74/100 and 71% at Metacritic and GameRankings, respectively.

Notes

References

External links
 

1986 video games
Amiga games
Arcade video games
Castlevania games
Commodore 64 games
DOS games
Famicom Disk System games
Game Boy Advance games
1980s horror video games
Mobile games
Nintendo Entertainment System games
Nintendo Vs. Series games
Platform games
PlayChoice-10 games
Single-player video games
Video games developed in Japan
Video games scored by Kinuyo Yamashita
Video games set in Transylvania
Virtual Console games
Virtual Console games for Wii U
Windows games
Virtual Console games for Nintendo 3DS

de:Castlevania#Castlevania (1986) (Vampire Killer, Haunted Castle, Castlevania X68000, Castlevania Chronicles, Super Castlevania IV)